Before the independence of Montenegro, football clubs from that country played in different competitions. From 1945 to 2006, Montenegrin club played in the leagues of SFR Yugoslavia, FR Yugoslavia and the State Union of Serbia and Montenegro.

Upon the independence referendum, Montenegrin Football Association established their own competitions, with the Montenegrin First League as a top tier.

History

As a part of the football system in SFR Yugoslavia, FR Yugoslavia and Serbia and Montenegro, Montenegrin clubs played in different leagues. Below is the table with chronology of competition system and leagues in which played Montenegrin teams during the each period from 1945 to 2006.

Montenegrin clubs in Yugoslav First League
Overall, seven different Montenegrin clubs played in the First League from 1946 to 2006. Most seasons played FK Budućnost (37) and FK Sutjeska (20). FK Rudar and FK Zeta played 6 seasons in First League, and FK Mogren 5 seasons. For one season, members of First League were FK Kom and FK Jedinstvo.

Participants and seasons (1946–1992)

During the existence of SFR Yugoslavia, Montenegrin clubs which participated in the First League were FK Budućnost and FK Sutjeska. Budućnost was among the clubs which participated in the first season of Yugoslav First League (1946–47).

Participants and seasons (1992–2006)

Due to fact that in new state union of FR Yugoslavia (later Serbia and Montenegro) were two republics, Montenegrin clubs find easier way to qualify for the First League. Among the clubs which played one or more seasons in the First League of FR Yugoslavia and, later, Serbia and Montenegro, were FK Budućnost, FK Sutjeska, FK Rudar, FK Mogren, FK Zeta, FK Kom and FK Jedinstvo.

Montenegrin clubs in Yugoslav Second League
There are 25 different Montenegrin clubs which played in Second League of SFR Yugoslavia, FR Yugoslavia and Serbia and Montenegro, in the period from 1947 to 2006. In the second tier of national football championship played FK Sutjeska (30 seasons), FK Lovćen (27 seasons), FK Mladost (24 seasons), FK Budućnost (21 seasons), FK Jedinstvo Bijelo Polje (18 seasons), FK Bokelj (15 seasons), FK Mogren (12 seasons), FK Berane (10 seasons), FK Čelik (9 seasons), FK Rudar (9 seasons), FK Iskra (8 seasons), FK Mornar (6 seasons), OFK Petrovac (6 seasons), OFK Grbalj (4 seasons), FK Ibar (4 seasons), FK Zabjelo (4 seasons), FK Arsenal (3 seasons), FK Jedinstvo Herceg Novi (3 seasons), FK Kom (3 seasons), FK Dečić (2 seasons) and FK Zeta (2 seasons). One season in Second League played OFK Igalo, FK Jezero, FK Radnički Nikšić and FK Zora.

Seasons 1947–1992

Football clubs from Montenegro played in the Yugoslav Second League since its founding in 1947, Montenegrin clubs won the champions title in second tier 14 times. From 1947 to 1992, 15 different Montenegrin clubs played in the Second League of SFR Yugoslavia.

Champions
Below is the list of Yugoslav Second League champions from Montenegro by seasons. Three clubs won the title - FK Budućnost - 6 times, FK Sutjeska (known as FK Nikšić, too) - 6 times and FK Lovćen - 2 times.

Participants
Overall, 15 different clubs from Montenegro participated in the Yugoslav Second League from season 1947/48 to 1991/92. Among them, FK Sutjeska, FK Lovćen, FK Budućnost and FK Mladost are only clubs which played more than 10 seasons in the Second League of SFR Yugoslavia.

Below is the list of Montenegrin clubs which played in Yugoslav Second League 1947-1992.

Seasons 1992–2006

During the period 1992-2006, Montenegrin clubs competed at second tier divisions which were a part of FR Yugoslavia / Serbia and Montenegro football system. There was four different periods and competition formats of Second League:

1992–93 - 1995–96 - Unified league

1996–97 - 1998–99 - Two divisions (east/west)

1999–2000 - Three divisions (north/east/west)

2000–01 - 2005–06 Four divisions (north/east/west/south - Montenegrin)

Bold - divisions in which played clubs from Montenegro

Champions
During the period 1992–2006, six different Montenegrin clubs won the title in FR Yugoslavia/Serbia and Montenegro Second League - FK Mogren - 2 times, FK Rudar - 2 times, FK Zeta - 1, FK Kom - 1, FK Budućnost - 1 and FK Jedinstvo Bijelo Polje - 1. Below is the list of Yugoslav Second League champions from Montenegro by seasons (1992–2006).

Participants
From the season 1992–93 until 2005–06, 22 Montenegrin teams played in the Yugoslav / Serbia and Montenegro Second League. Biggest number of seasons had FK Jedinstvo Bijelo Polje and FK Mogren (9).
Below is the list of Montenegrin clubs which played in Yugoslav Second League 1992–2006.

Montenegrin clubs in Yugoslav Third League
Yugoslav Third League is rank which existed five seasons, and 11 different Montenegrin clubs were part of it. League existed during the season 1950, and from 1988–89 to 1991–92. During the season 1950, competition was named Third League, and from 1988 to 1992 it was played under the name Inter-Republic League.

Participants
From the season 1950 until 1991–92, 8 Montenegrin teams played in the Yugoslav Third League. Biggest number of seasons had FK Berane and FK Bokelj (4).
Below is the list of Montenegrin clubs which played in Yugoslav Third League.

Montenegrin Republic League

Montenegrin regional league system
From 1968, regional leagues are the lowest-rank competition in Montenegro. There are three leagues (North, Center, South). Regional system is still existing competition, known as Montenegrin Third League.

Champions by seasons

Seasons 1968–2006

See also
Football in Montenegro
Montenegrin Republic League
Montenegrin Republic Cup (1947–2006)
Montenegrin clubs in European football competitions
Montenegrin First League
Montenegrin Second League
Montenegrin Third League
Montenegrin Cup

Lists of Montenegrin football club seasons
Football in Serbia and Montenegro
Football in Montenegro